Colin Gibson is an Australian production designer.  He is known for his collaborations with George Miller, including Babe, Babe 2: Pig in the City, Happy Feet, Happy Feet Two, and Mad Max: Fury Road, the latter of which resulted in winning the Academy Award for Best Production Design and an AACTA Award. Gibson's other work includes The Adventures of Priscilla, Queen of the Desert, for which he shared a BAFTA award nomination with Owen Paterson.

Career 
Colin Gibson designed the bus for the film The Adventures of Priscilla, Queen of the Desert and all the vehicles in Mad Max: Fury Road.  He joined the production of the latter film in 2000, and first began building cars in 2003.  The film soon entered development hell and did not resume production until 2011.  Director George Miller insisted that all the vehicles and props be fully functional, including a flame-throwing guitar that was played live.

Awards

References

External links 
 

Living people
Australian art directors
Australian filmmakers
Australian production designers
Best Art Direction Academy Award winners
Best Production Design AACTA Award winners
Best Production Design BAFTA Award winners
Year of birth missing (living people)